Sylvana Anali Rivera Gómez is a beach volleyball player from Guatemala, who played with María Orellana in the 2003 Pan American Games in Santo Domingo, Dominican Republic. They finished in the 5th position.

References

 
 

Year of birth missing (living people)
Living people
Guatemalan beach volleyball players
Women's beach volleyball players
Beach volleyball players at the 2003 Pan American Games
Pan American Games competitors for Guatemala